Siluvaicheriis a village near to Andimadam in the Udayarpalayam taluk of Ariyalur district, Tamil Nadu, India. Old name is Sivacheri, a Shiva lingam located in this village established by Sri Agathiyar.

Demographics 

As per the 2001 census, Siluvaicheri had a total population of 2277 with 1143 males and 1134 females.

References 

Villages in Ariyalur district